"Get Loose" is a song written, produced, and performed by American hip hop recording artist Lil Jon. It was released as a single on October 2, 2015 through Dim Mak Records. The song rose to prominence after being featured in a 2015 Bud Light commercial.

Charts

Weekly charts

References

2015 singles
Lil Jon songs
Song recordings produced by Lil Jon
2015 songs
Songs written by Lil Jon